Serra Imeri is a mountain in South America, just north of the equator.

See also
 List of Ultras of South America

References

External links
 "Serra Imeri, Venezuela/Brazil" on Peakbagger

Imeri
Imeri
Imeri
Brazil–Venezuela border
Landforms of Amazonas (Brazilian state)